Max Purcell and Luke Saville were the defending champions but chose not to compete.

Manuel Guinard and Zdeněk Kolář won the title after defeating Marc-Andrea Hüsler and Dominic Stricker 6–3, 6–4 in the final.

Seeds

Draw

References

External links
 Main draw

Traralgon International - Men's Doubles